The tennis competitions at the 2022 Mediterranean Games in Oran took place from 27 June to 1 July at the Habib Khelil Tennis Complex. 
Athletes will compete in 4 events.

Medal table

Medalists

References

External links
Results book

Sports at the 2022 Mediterranean Games
2022
Mediterranean Games